Corn Creek is an unincorporated community in Clark County, Nevada, United States. The community is located along the former Las Vegas and Tonopah Railroad where it had a station. It is approximately 7.5 miles from the Las Vegas city limits by road and is situated south of the Desert National Wildlife Refuge border and bordered to the west, south, and east with the Tule Springs Fossil Beds National Monument.

Corn Creek is an off-the-grid community, relying on power from propane tanks and solar panels.

Geography

Visible in the east are the Sheep Range and Fossil Ridge, Castle Rock, and Gass Peak of the Las Vegas Range. To the west are the Spring Mountains.

Climate
Corn Creek has a cool desert climate (Köppen BWk).

Recreation
To the northeast up Corn Creek Road is Corn Creek Campsite and the Desert National Wildlife Refuge visitor center and parking lot. Trails and dirt roads from the visitor center provide access to the Sheep Range and Las Vegas Range and Tule Springs Fossil Beds National Monument located further south closer to Las Vegas.

Corn Creek Road
Corn Creek Road is a roughly 4-mile paved road that provides access to the community via Landy Street and the DNWR visitor center and Corn Creek Campsite from U.S. Route 95. The road has a 45 mph speed limit. The western half is located in the Tule Springs Fossil Beds National Monument and the eastern half in the Desert National Wildlife Refuge.

At the end of the road, Alamo Road and Mormon Well Road are accessible as well as Gass Peak Road which spurs off Mormon Well Road further into the wildlife refuge.

References

Further reading
 Corn Creek and the History of Las Vegas Valley

Unincorporated communities in Clark County, Nevada